John Taylor (born 24 June 1924) was an English professional footballer who played as an  inside forward.

Career
Born in Bradford, Taylor spent his early career with Manningham Mills and Kilmarnock. He signed for Bradford City in September 1946, scoring 2 goals in 2 league appearances for the club, before being released in 1947.

Sources

References

1924 births
Date of death missing
English footballers
Kilmarnock F.C. players
Bradford City A.F.C. players
English Football League players
Association football inside forwards